Gustavo Cerati (August 11, 1959 – September 4, 2014) was a guitarist, singer, musician, composer and Argentine record producer of Latin rock. He began his career as the leader of the band Soda Stereo for after developing a solo career.

Albums

Studio albums

Live albums

Compilation albums

Remix albums 
 Reversiones: Siempre es Hoy (2003)

Singles/EPs 
 "Raíz" simple (1999)
 "Puente" simple (1999)
 "La excepción" simple (2007)

Soundtracks 
 Sólo por hoy (1998)
 +Bien (2001)

Collaborations

Other appearances

Videography

DVD 
 11 episodios sinfónicos (2003)
 Canciones elegidas 93-04 (2004)
 Gustavo Cerati: Ahí Vamos Tour (2007)
 Gustavo Cerati en Monterrey (2019)

Music videos 
 1993: "Te llevo para que me lleves" (Directed by: Daniel Bohm & Pablo Fischerman)
 1993: "Pulsar" (Directed by: Gabriela Malerba & Alejandro Ros)
 1994: "Lisa" (Directed by: Ariel Guelferbein)
 1999: "Puente" (Directed by: Andy Fogwill)
 1999: "Paseo inmoral" (Directed by: Gustavo Cerati & Picky Talarico)
 2000: "Tabú" (Directed by: Stanley)
 2000: "Engaña" (Directed by: Cecilia Amenábar & Eduardo Capilla)
 2000: "Río Babel (Directed by: Emiliano López)
 2001: "Persiana americana" (Directed by: Diego Sáenz)
 2001: "Corazón delator" (Directed by: Diego Sáenz)
 2002: "Cosas imposibles" (Directed by: Diego Kaplan & Juan Antín)
 2003: "Karaoke" (Directed by: Sebastian Sánchez)
 2003: "Artefacto" (Directed by: Germán Sáez)
 2006: "Crimen" (Directed by: Joaquín Cambre)
 2006: "La excepción" (Directed by: Ezequiel de San Pablo, Jorge Jaramillo & Antonio Balseiro)
 2007: "Adiós" (Directed by: Joaquín Cambre)
 2007: "Lago en el cielo" (Directed by: Andy Fogwill)
 2008: "Me quedo aquí" (Directed by: Oscar Fernández + Reino and Landia)
 2009: "Déjà vu" (Directed by: Andy Fogwill, Maxi Blanco & Summer)
 2009: "Rapto" (Directed by: Andy Fogwill, Maxi Blanco & Summer)
 2021: "No te creo" (Filmed in 2004) (Directed by: Nicolás Bernaudo, Diego Panich & Lemon)

Other projects

Soda Stereo

Cerati/Melero 
 Colores santos (1992)
 Colores santos: The Remixes (1995)

Plan V 
 Plan V (1996)
 Plan V + Black Dog (1998) (EP compartido con The Black Dog)

Cerati/Andy Summers 
 Outlandos D'Americas: A Rock en Español Tribute to the Police (1998)

Ocio 
 Medida universal (1999)
 Insular (2000) (EP)

Discographies of Argentine artists
Rock music discographies